Demidovo is a rural locality (a village) in Levichanskoye Rural Settlement, Kosinsky District, Perm Krai, Russia. The population was 21 as of 2010. There are 2 streets.

Geography 
It is located 48 km south-east from Kosa.

References 

Rural localities in Kosinsky District